is a Japanese former footballer.

Career statistics

Club

Notes

References

1987 births
Living people
Japanese footballers
Association football midfielders
Singapore Premier League players
Lao Premier League players
Japan Soccer College players
Albirex Niigata Singapore FC players
Master 7 FC players
Japanese expatriate sportspeople in Singapore
Expatriate footballers in Singapore
Japanese expatriate sportspeople in Thailand
Expatriate footballers in Thailand
Japanese expatriate sportspeople in Laos
Expatriate footballers in Laos